Steffi Graf defeated the six-time defending champion Martina Navratilova in the final, 5–7, 6–2, 6–1 to win the ladies' singles tennis title at the 1988 Wimbledon Championships. It was her first Wimbledon singles title and fourth  major title overall. It was also Graf's third step towards completing the first, and so far only Golden Slam in the history of tennis.

The semifinal match between Chris Evert and Navratilova marked the last time they faced each other in a major, with Navratilova extending her lead in their head-to-head rivalry at majors to 14-8.

Seeds

  Steffi Graf (champion)
  Martina Navratilova (final)
  Pam Shriver (semifinals)
  Chris Evert (semifinals)
  Gabriela Sabatini (fourth round)
  Helena Suková (quarterfinals)
  Manuela Maleeva-Fragnière (first round)
  Natasha Zvereva (fourth round)
  Hana Mandlíková (third round)
  Lori McNeil (third round)
  Claudia Kohde-Kilsch (withdrew)
  Zina Garrison (quarterfinals)
  Larisa Savchenko (fourth round)
  Katerina Maleeva (fourth round)
  Sylvia Hanika (third round)
  Mary Joe Fernández (fourth round)

Claudia Kohde-Kilsch withdrew due to a knee injury. She was replaced in the draw by lucky loser Shaun Stafford.

Qualifying

Draw

Finals

Top half

Section 1

Section 2

Section 3

Section 4

Bottom half

Section 5

Section 6

Section 7

Section 8

See also
 Evert–Navratilova rivalry

References

External links

1988 Wimbledon Championships – Women's draws and results at the International Tennis Federation

Women's Singles
Wimbledon Championship by year – Women's singles
Wimbledon Championships
Wimbledon Championships